Faruk Yiğit (born 15 April 1968 in Trabzon) was a Turkish football player.

He played for several clubs, including Orhangazi Gençlerbirliği, Yalovaspor, Boluspor, Kocaelispor, Fenerbahçe, Ankaragücü and Diyarbakırspor.

He played for Turkey national football team and was a participant at the 1996 UEFA European Championship.

Honours 
Kocaelispor
 Turkish Cup: 1997

References

1968 births
Living people
Turkish footballers
Turkey international footballers
Association football forwards
Fenerbahçe S.K. footballers
Kocaelispor footballers
Boluspor footballers
Diyarbakırspor footballers
MKE Ankaragücü footballers
UEFA Euro 1996 players
Süper Lig players